Missie McGeorge (born August 20, 1959) is an American professional golfer who played on the LPGA Tour.

McGeorge won once on the LPGA Tour in 1994.

Professional wins

LPGA Tour wins (1)

References

External links

American female golfers
LPGA Tour golfers
Golfers from Colorado
Southern Methodist University alumni
Sportspeople from Pueblo, Colorado
1959 births
Living people
21st-century American women